The Best of the Best American Poetry 1988–1997, a volume in The Best American Poetry series, was edited by David Lehman and by guest editor Harold Bloom, who chose the poems.

Bloom selected poems from every entry in the series through 1997, with the exception of the 1996 volume, edited by Adrienne Rich.  Bloom criticized the 1996 issue in his introductory essay, claiming that Rich had selected poems based on the "race, gender, sexual orientation, ethnic origin, and political purpose of the would-be poet", rather than on aesthetic merit . Lehman wrote in his own introductory essay that he believed a number of Rich's selections would have met Bloom's criteria, and that he disagreed with Bloom's decision to exclude any poems from Rich's editorship .

Critical reaction
The Boston Review printed Bloom's preface and in the following issue included responses from, among others, Mark Doty, Ann Lauterbach, Rita Dove, J. D. McClatchy, Donald Revell, Heather McHugh, Thylias Moss, Reginald Shepherd, Carol Muske, Sven Birkerts, and Marjorie Perloff.

Of "Best of" anthologies generally, JoAnn Gutin wrote in Salon.com, "Those who pride themselves on the catholicity or adventurousness of their reading tastes may well take a dim view of the 'Best of' boom. I can envision intellectuals saying, with a certain hauteur, 'I would never allow someone to choose what I read.' These are probably the same people who ask for menu substitutions in nice restaurants...or who walk around looking like the wrath of God under the impression that they have a 'personal style.' My position is, if it's good enough for John Updike or Joyce Carol Oates or Harold Bloom, it's good enough for me" .

Poets and poems included

See also
 1998 in poetry

Notes

External links
 Web page for contents of the book, with links to each edition where the poems previously appeared

Best American Poetry series
1998 poetry books
American poetry anthologies